Sidi Ali El Gorjani whose real name is Abu Hassan Ali El Gorjani, died in 1282, is a Tunisian holy man and author of El Manakab.

He is buried in a cemetery bearing his name, in the south of the medina of Tunis. This cemetery has become the public garden of El Gorjani.

References

Medina of Tunis